Juan Enrique López (born May 16, 1962), nicknamed "Porky", is a Puerto Rican former professional baseball player, bullpen catcher, and coach. He was a bullpen coach in Major League Baseball (MLB) for three different National League teams during 14 seasons between 1999 and 2013.

Professional career
As player
López was signed as a non-drafted free agent by the Cleveland Indians in 1983. He played six seasons in the minor leagues, between 1983 and 1989, for the Indians, Houston Astros, and San Francisco Giants organizations. He briefly reached the Triple-A level, appearing in 21 games for the Tucson Toros of the Pacific Coast League in 1987.

As coach
López started his coaching career as a minor league coach for the Giants' extended spring training in 1990. He coached for the rookie-level Arizona League Giants from 1991 to 1993. He was then a scout for the Detroit Tigers in 1994. In 1995 and 1996 he coached in the Giants' farm system for the Bellingham Giants and Burlington Bees, respectively. He then was the bullpen catcher for the major-league Giants in 1997 and 1998.

López was the Giants' major-league bullpen coach from 1999 to 2002, working under manager Dusty Baker. López followed Baker to the Chicago Cubs in 2003, working as their bullpen coach from 2003 to 2006. Following the departure of Baker, López left the Cubs and was the manager of the rookie-level Gulf Coast League Mets during 2007.

In 2008, López joined Baker once again as the Cincinnati Reds bullpen coach, and served in that role through the 2013 season.

Personal life

López graduated from Nicolas Sevilla High School in Toa Alta, Puerto Rico, in 1978. He played baseball at Yavapai Junior College in Prescott, Arizona. He and his wife Flor Sanchez have three children: Jack (also a professional baseball player), Aleimalee, and Johnnielee.

References

External links

1962 births
Living people
Asheville Tourists players
Baseball catchers
Batavia Trojans players
Brooklyn Cyclones coaches
Chicago Cubs coaches
Cincinnati Reds coaches
Clinton Giants players
Columbus Astros players
Minor league baseball managers
Osceola Astros players
People from Toa Alta, Puerto Rico
Puerto Rican baseball players
Waterloo Indians players
San Francisco Giants coaches
Tucson Toros players